The 1983 Baltimore mayoral election saw the reelection of William Donald Schaefer to a fourth consecutive term.

Nominations
Primary elections were held September 13.

Democratic primary

Republican primary

General election
The general election was held November 8.

References

Baltimore mayoral
Mayoral elections in Baltimore
Baltimore